The following is a timeline of the history of the municipality of San Juan, Puerto Rico.

16th–18th centuries

 1511 – First Catholic Diocese established in San Juan
 1521 – "Ciudad de San Juan Bautista de Puerto Rico" founded by Spanish colonists from nearby Caparra.
 1523 – Convento de Santo Tomas de Aquino founded.
 1524 – Nuestra Senora de la Concepcion hospital built.
 1526 – October 4: St. Francis Hurricane occurs.
 1529 – October 18: Harbor attack by Caribs.
 1530
 August 5: Hurricane occurs.
 Casa Blanca built.
 1532 – San José Church construction begins.
 1540 – La Fortaleza built. 
 1542 – Cathedral of San Juan Bautista construction begins.
 1560 – City wall construction begins.
 1560s – San Antonio Bridge built across Condado Lagoon.
 1568 – September 7: Hurricane occurs.
 1582 – Population: 850 (approximate estimate).
 1591 – Castillo San Felipe del Morro construction begins.
 1595 – November 22: Battle of San Juan begins.
 1598 – June: San Juan taken by British forces; Boquerón battery sacked.
 1605 – Cabildo constructed in Plaza de San Juan.
 1615 – September 12: Hurricane occurs.
 1625 – September 24: Town besieged by Dutch forces.
 1733 – Palacio Episcopal construction begins (approximate date).
 1769 – Powder house built.
 1780 – Capilla del Santo Cristo de la Salud (chapel) built.
 1783 – Castillo de San Cristóbal built.
 1787
 May 2: 1787 Boricua earthquake.
 May 3: Fiesta de Cruz begins.
 1797 – April: San Juan besieged by British forces.

19th century
 1806 – Gaceta de Puerto Rico newspaper begins publication.
 1813 – Sociedad Económica de Amigos del País en Puerto Rico founded.
 1820 – Population: 7,658.
 1822 – Board of charity established.
 1823 – Sociedad Filarmónica (philharmonic society) formed.
 1832
  established.
 Teatro Municipal (theatre) opens.
 1840 – Colegio de Abogados founded.
 1845 – Town divided into barrios San Francisco, San Juan, Santa Barbara, Santo Domingo, and Ballaja.
 1848 – Cafe de La Mallorquina in business.
 1850 – Real Intendencia Building constructed.
 1853
 Cataño-San Juan steamship begins operating.
 Marketplace built in Santa Barbara barrio.
 1859 – Barrios De la Marina and Puerta de Tierra become part of San Juan.
 1863
 Santurce becomes part of San Juan.
 Santa María Magdalena de Pazzis Cemetery established.
 1864 – Ballajá Barracks built.
 1865 – Colegio de Párvulos built.
 1873 – Slavery officially abolished in Puerto Rico.
 1876 – Ateneo Puertorriqueño (cultural entity) founded.
 1877 – Cárcel de la Princesa (prison) built.
 1879 – José Ramón Becerra y de Gárate becomes mayor.
 1885 – Civil Hospital built.
 1888 – La Carbonera barrio becomes part of San Juan.
 1893
 Sociedad Anónima de Economías y Préstamos (later Banco Popular de Puerto Rico) founded.
 Christopher Columbus statue erected in the Plaza Colón.
 1894 – Population: 23,414.
 1898
 May 12: Bombardment of San Juan by United States forces.
 June 22: Second Battle of San Juan.
 June 28: Third Battle of San Juan.
 August 12: End of hostilities between US and Spanish military forces. United States Military Government begins.
 October: Francisco del Valle becomes mayor.
 Carretera Central (Ponce-San Juan road) built.
 San Juan News begins publication.
 Railway built (approximate date).
 1899
 April 11: Town becomes part of United States-annexed Puerto Rico per Treaty of Paris.
 Chamber of commerce founded.
 Population: 32,048.
 1900
 May 1: Foraker Act comes into force, civil government for Puerto Rico begins. United States Military Government ends.
 Supreme Court of Puerto Rico and Puerto Rico Department of Education headquartered in San Juan.
 Insane asylum established.
 La Perla settlement begins (approximate date).

20th century

1900s–1950s
 1901
 Trolley de San Juan begins operating.
 San Juan high school opens.
 1902 – City government formed into legislative and executive branches.
 1903
 University of Puerto Rico established.
 Roberto H. Todd Weels becomes mayor.
 1909 – Harbor enlarged.
 1910
 Dos Hermanos Bridge opens.
 Puerto Rico Ilustrado begins publication.
 Population: 48,716.
 1913 – Cine Luna opens.
 1918 – October 11: 1918 San Fermín earthquake.
 1919
 San Juan Asamblea Municipal (municipal assembly) and Concejo de Administración (administrative council) created.
 Condado Vanderbilt Hotel in business.
 1920 – Population: 70,707.
 1921 – Academia del Perpetuo Socorro founded.
 1922 – WKAQ radio begins broadcasting.
 1923
 U.S. military Fort Buchanan established.
 Mansion Georgetti (residence) built.
 1925 – Academia San Jorge founded.
 1928
 Luis Muñoz Rivera Park laid out.
 September: San Felipe Segundo Hurricane occurs.
 1929
 Women's suffrage begins in Puerto Rico.
 Capitol of Puerto Rico building constructed.
 1930 – Population: 114,715.
 1932 – September–October: San Ciprian hurricane.
 1935 – Puerto Rico Reconstruction Administration headquartered in San Juan.
 1939 – Martín Peña Bridge built.
 1940
 United States Naval Air Station Isla Grande established.
 Population: 169,247.
 1946 – Felisa Rincón de Gautier becomes mayor.
 1947 – WAPA, WIAC, WITA, and WRSJ radio begin broadcasting.
 1948 –  design adopted.
 1949
 Caribe Hilton Hotel built.
 San Juan National Historic Site United States National Park Service established.
 1950
 October 30: San Juan Nationalist revolt.
 Residencial Las Casas housing complex built.
 Population: 224,767.
 1951 – Río Piedras becomes part of San Juan municipality.
 1952 – City becomes part of newly created Commonwealth of Puerto Rico.
 1954
 WAPA-TV and WKAQ-TV (television) begin broadcasting.
 Ballets de San Juan founded.
 1955
 Luis Muñoz Marín International Airport opens.
 Institute of Puerto Rican Culture and Archivo General de Puerto Rico headquartered in city.
 1956 – Casals Festival of music begins.
 1958
 Supreme Court Building constructed.
 Casa del Libro established.
 1959
 June: U.S. National Governors Association meets in San Juan.
 Regional Puerto Rico Metropolitan Bus Authority established.
 The San Juan Star English-language newspaper begins publication.

1960s–1990s

 1960
 Office of Secretario de la Asamblea Municipal (secretary of the municipal assembly) created.
 Conservatory of Music of Puerto Rico opens.
 Roman Catholic Archdiocese of San Juan de Puerto Rico formed.
 Population: 451,658.
 1962 – Hotel El Convento in business.
 1966
 Polytechnic University of Puerto Rico and San Juan Children's Choir established.
 July: 1966 Central American and Caribbean Games held.
 1968 – Plaza Las Américas shopping mall in business.
 1970
 San Sebastián Street Festival active.
 Population: 452,749.
 1971 – San Juan Botanical Garden inaugurated.
 1973 – Puerto Rico National Library headquartered in city.
 1974 – April: Association of Caribbean Historians organized during meeting in San Juan.
 1976 – June: 2nd G7 summit held near city.
 1979 – July: 1979 Pan American Games held.
 1981 – Centro de Bellas Artes (opera house) opens.
 1983 – Old San Juan designated an UNESCO World Heritage Site.
 1984 – Puerto Rico Museum of Contemporary Art established.
 1986
 June: U.S. Conference of Mayors held in San Juan.
 San Juan Philharmonic Chorale formed.
 1988 – Archivo Histórico Arquidiocesano de San Juan (historical archives) established.
 1989
 September: Hurricane Hugo.
 Sociedad Puertorriqueña de Genealogía headquartered in San Juan.
 1991 – Autonomous Municipalities Act of 1991 created.
 1992
 Plaza del Quinto Centenario built.
 Museo de Las Américas established in the former Ballajá Barracks.
 1994 – Teodoro Moscoso Bridge opens.
 2000 – Museo de Arte de Puerto Rico established.

21st century

 2004
 September: Hurricane Jeanne occurs.
 Tren Urbano (regional rapid transit system) begins operating.
 Martín Peña Channel "G-8" group formed.
 2008 – September: Hurricane Kyle occurs.
 2009 – May: Economic protest.
 2010 – Population: 395,326.
 2012 – November 6: Territorial Puerto Rican status referendum, 2012 held.
 2013 – Carmen Yulín Cruz becomes Mayor of San Juan.
 2017 - September 20: Hurricane Maria occurs and is covered extensively by CBS journalist David Begnaud
 2019 - July 8 - August 12: Protests throughout San Juan in response to Telegramgate
 2021 - Miguel Romero becomes Mayor of San Juan .

See also

 San Juan history
 List of mayors of San Juan, Puerto Rico
 List of bishops of San Juan, since 1511
 Subdivisions of San Juan, Puerto Rico
 National Register of Historic Places listings in metropolitan San Juan, Puerto Rico
 Timelines of other municipalities in Puerto Rico: municipalities in Puerto Rico: Bayamón, Hormigueros (in Spanish), Mayagüez, Ponce

References

Bibliography

Published in 17th–19th centuries
in English
 
 
 
 
 
 

in Spanish
 
 
 
 
 

in other languages

Published in 20th century
in English
  (Includes bibliographic information relevant to San Juan, p. 53+ etc.)
 
 
 
 
 
 
 
 
 
 
 
 
 
 
  (Abstract)
 
 

in Spanish
  (Directory)

Published in 21st century
in English
 
 
 

in Spanish

External links

 Items related to San Juan, various dates (via University of Puerto Rico's Biblioteca Digital Puertorriqueña)
 
  (Includes bibliographic information on San Juan history)
 , ca.1766–2003
 Materials related to San Juan, Puerto Rico, various dates (via U.S. Library of Congress, Prints & Photos Division)
 Works related to San Juan, PR, various dates (via Digital Public Library of America).
 Map of San Juan, 1982
 Map of San Juan, 1940
 
  Located in the Palacio Arzobispal on Calle San Sebastián
 Digitized materials related to San Juan in the Archivo Histórico Nacional of Spain, records of the Ministerio de Ultramar; via Portal de Archivos Españoles

Timeline
San Juan, Puerto Rico-related lists
San Juan